The Kenney Ministry was the combined Cabinet (called Executive Council of Alberta), chaired by 18th Premier of Alberta Jason Kenney, that governed Alberta from April 2019 until October 2022.

During Kenney's tenure, the Executive Council (commonly known as the Cabinet) was made up of members of the United Conservative Party, which held a majority of the seats in the Legislative Assembly of Alberta.  The Cabinet was appointed by the Lieutenant Governor of Alberta, Lois Mitchell, on the advice of the premier.

In September 2022, the United Conservative Party board announced a leadership review would take place at the Party's annual general meeting in April 2022, ahead of the previous plans for a leadership review to take place in Fall 2022. In March 2022, the United Conservative Party changed the format for the leadership review, moving to a mail-in ballot beginning in April 2022, with results to be announced on May 18, 2022.

On May 18, 2022, after receiving support from 51.4 per cent of the United Conservative Party members, Kenney announced he would step down as leader of the United Conservative Party. The United Conservative Party caucus met on May 19, 2022, and caucus chair Nathan Neudorf released a statement affirming that Kenney would remain as leader of the party until a new leader is elected. Kenney subsequently sent a letter to the party secretary informing her of his intention to resign as leader of the party after a new leader is elected.

Danielle Smith was selected as the leader of the United Conservative Party in the October 2022 United Conservative Party leadership election, and was sworn in as the 19th Premier of Alberta on October 11, 2022. Smith appointed a new ministry one week later.

List of members of the Ministry of Jason Kenney

Associate Ministers

Cabinet shuffles
On August 25, 2020, Doug Schweitzer moved from the Department of Justice to a newly formed ministry—Jobs, Economy and Innovation. The new ministry—Jobs, Economy and Innovation replaced the ministry of Economic Development, Trade and Tourism the former Economic Development, Trade and Tourism ministries. Kaycee Madu replaced Schweitzer as Minister of Justice. Tracy Allard became the Minister of Municipal Affairs.

On July 8, 2021, Premier Kenney announced a major cabinet shuffle, moving Rajan Sawhney from Community and Social Services to Transportation; promoting Jason Luan to Community and Social Services; permanently moving Ric McIver to Municipal Affairs; promoting Ron Orr to Culture; dropping Grant Hunter and Leela Aheer from cabinet roles; and adding Nate Horner as Associate Minister of Rural Economic Development, and Mike Ellis as Associate Minister of Mental Health and Addictions.

See also
Executive Council of Alberta
List of Alberta provincial ministers

References

External links 
 Kenney cabinet

Politics of Alberta
Executive Council of Alberta
2019 establishments in Alberta
Cabinets established in 2019
2022 disestablishments in Alberta
Cabinets disestablished in 2022
2019 in Canadian politics
2020 in Canadian politics
2021 in Canadian politics
2022 in Canadian politics